Pop Will Eat Itself are an English alternative rock band formed in 1986 in Stourbridge in the West Midlands of England with members from Birmingham, Coventry and the Black Country. Initially known as a grebo act, they changed style to incorporate sample-driven indie and industrial rock.  Graham Crabb describes their sound as "electronic, punk, alternative hip-hop, hybrid music for fucking, fighting & smoking cigars". Their highest-charting single was the 1993 top-ten hit "Get the Girl! Kill the Baddies!". After initially disbanding in 1996, and having a brief reformation in 2005, they issued their first release in more than five years in 2010.

Career

Early years: 1981–1988
An early permutation of the band formed in 1981 under the name From Eden. Members included Clint Mansell, Adam Mole, Chris Fradgley, Malcolm Treece and Miles Hunt (Treece and Hunt went on to form The Wonder Stuff). From Eden recruited Graham Crabb from ‘Kit-Form Colossus’ to replace Hunt on drums before splitting up.

Crabb, Mole and Mansell recruited Richard March and changed their band name to Wild and Wandering (known locally as Blind and Blundering because they always performed in an intoxicated state). The name came from a Wasted Youth album under which one E.P. was released (2,000 Light Ales from Home on Iguana Records) before eventually becoming Pop Will Eat Itself in 1986.  The new name was taken from a quotation in an NME article on Jamie Wednesday by David Quantick.

First single: "Poppies Say Grrr!" and tour
In 1986, the band released the "Poppies Say Grrr!" single, which became Single of the Week in the NME and playlisted by Janice Long on BBC Radio 1. The single was sold in a brown paper bag and was made available for sale at Martin Newsagents in Stourbridge High Street as well as from the home of one of the band.

With their new-found popularity, the band set off on a six-week tour of Europe, often encountering hostility at the set length being less than half an hour, even though this comprised around 16 tracks: all the band had.

Influences
During this time the band was listening to more hip hop (Run DMC, Public Enemy and The Beastie Boys) as well as music from a new emerging movement of sample-heavy dance records (The Justified Ancients of Mu-Mu, MARRS, S'Express and Bomb The Bass).

After hearing Robert Gordon's remix of their cover of Sigue Sigue Sputnik's "Love Missile F1-11" and Age Of Chance's mini-LP Crush Collision (also engineered by Gordon), the band glimpsed their future as hip-hop/dance/rock music pioneers and decided to record their debut album Box Frenzy with Robert at Sheffield's FON studios in June/July 1987. It was here the band met The Designers Republic, which was to be the start of a very successful partnership. The album came out on manager Craig Jennings' Chapter 22 label. 'CJ' still manages the band to the present day, along with the roster at Jennings' firm, Raw Power Management.

The transition from punky guitar music to incorporating state-of-the-art production and new musical territories was not dissimilar to a path previously trodden by one of the band's musical heroes The Clash and subsequently Big Audio Dynamite. The album surprised the band's fans and perplexed the music critics. Crabb, now more immersed in sample-finding and songwriting, moved from behind the drum kit to being a co-vocalist with Mansell and was replaced by a drum machine called Dr. Nightmare. March took on programming duties and became the band expert on all things Atari and Akai. "Beaver Patrol", a cover of the Wilde Knights song, (suggested to the band by Bobby Gillespie of Primal Scream), caused some controversy for its offensive lyrics but "There Is No Love Between Us Anymore" made the lower reaches of the UK charts and as a result, PWEI were signed to the record label  RCA. Whilst much confusion ensued around the dramatic change of direction, PWEI secured a first by being the first Western independent band to be invited to play the then Soviet Union.

Chart success
The band achieved Top 40 hits with "Can U Dig It?" and "Wise Up! Sucker" from their album, This Is the Day...This Is the Hour...This Is This! In late 1988 PWEI were invited by Rush Management to support Run DMC on their European tour. Main support act Public Enemy were becoming increasingly popular and had a large and militant following who booed off all support acts, in particular, PWEI, who agreed to leave the tour when the situation deteriorated in Amsterdam.

The RCA years: 1989–1993
They released three successful albums on RCA. The first two (…This is This! and Cure for Sanity) were recorded with the aid of Flood, known for his work with Nine Inch Nails, U2 and Depeche Mode. The band toured extensively in the UK, Europe, and US, including appearances at Reading Festival. Their singles charted progressively higher, with every single release charting inside the UK Top Forty from 1990 until their final single release in 1994.

On 1992's The Looks or the Lifestyle? the band recruited John "Fuzz" Townshend as their drummer to complement their standard array of loops and pre-programmed drums. The band had discussed adding a live drummer in 1990, however touring commitments made it impractical to do so until the band were able to break touring activity in late 1991 to commence recording.  The album peaked at UK No. 15 and featured the Top 30 hit singles "Karmadrome" and "Bulletproof!" Despite healthy sales and successful widescale touring the band's biggest supporters at RCA had left the company by January 1993 and the remaining executives did not understand the band or their music, suggesting at one meeting that EMF 'write a hit' for them.  The band was dropped from the label before the "Get the Girl! Kill the Baddies!" single was released.  It went on to peak at number 9 in the UK Singles Chart, becoming the band's biggest hit and making the band at that time the highest charting act to appear on Top of the Pops without a record deal. In an attempt to recoup their investment, the label released a live album Live at Weird's Bar and Grill recorded in London in October 1992.

Industrial influence: 1994–1995

PWEI's political stance became more explicit with the release of the single "Ich Bin Ein Auslander". A collaboration with Asian group Fun-Da-Mental, the song had anti-Nazi styled lyrics and reached the UK Top 30. A different version of this song later appeared as the opening track on the 1994 album, Dos Dedos Mis Amigos. The album peaked at No. 11 in the UK Albums Chart and spawned their then final single release, "Everything's Cool", which became their ninth Top 30 UK hit. The band also collaborated with The Prodigy on the track "Their Law", featured in their breakthrough second album Music For The Jilted Generation. This track also had political content, serving as a protest against Great Britain's Criminal Justice And Public order Act 1994, which had criminalized rave culture.

The band found some new popularity after signing with Trent Reznor's Nothing Records in the US, and touring with Nine Inch Nails, as well as having their songs used on the PlayStation game Loaded. In March 1995 the band released the Dos Dedos Mis Amigos remix album Two Fingers My Friends! which featured remixes by The Orb, Apollo 440 and Renegade Soundwave.  Crabb left the band in Summer 1995 - originally proposing to contribute in a non-touring capacity due to fatherhood - however, the band decided to replace him with Kerry Hammond on guitar and backing vocals, with Mansell taking over full vocal duties. The band decided to split in May 1996, (with 12 songs recorded and mixed in a state of near completion), and toured the UK briefly in June 1996 with a final live show at Roskilde. At this point, their set contained several unreleased songs from the unfinished album. Two tracks from this period were released at the time, a cover version of Gary Numan's "Friends", released on the 1997 tribute album Random, and an instrumental track called "Zero Return" on a magazine sampler.  In 2013, the songs from the unfinished album were assembled into a bonus disc with the reissue of "Dos Dedos Mis Amigos", comprising the 'unreleased 1996 album', now titled A Lick of the Old Cassette Box.

Disbanded: 1996
Crabb concentrated on his ambient side project Golden Claw Musics. After the rest of the band split in 1996, March and Townshend went on to form the big beat band Bentley Rhythm Ace. Townshend also released two solo albums and Mansell wrote a number of film scores, including Requiem for a Dream, π, Doom,  The Fountain, The Wrestler, Moon, and Black Swan.

Reformation: 2005
The band reformed to play their first gigs in eight years, in Nottingham, Birmingham, and London in January 2005. These gigs were notable for their Instant Live albums, whereby ten minutes after the completion of each gig, double live albums of the performance could be purchased.

The band released a preview of new material called Sonic Noise Byte on 4 November 2005, as a torrent download for members of their official website pweination. However, an announcement on the official website in March 2006 confirmed that Mansell and March would no longer be involved in the project due to other work commitments, effectively ending the PWEI reformation. However the remaining band members continued as Vileevils, and released the tracks "Retro Dreaming" and "Street Fightin" for download via the pweination website.

A secret, one-night PWEI reunion was scheduled to happen at the Vileevils show at Stourbridge Rock Cafe on 9 June 2007, but was foiled when Mansell was unable to obtain a visa in time to fly back to the UK.  March still appeared at the show, and after the Vileevils set they played the planned PWEI songs, without Mansell.

Vileevils performed their final live date in December 2008 supporting Ned's Atomic Dustbin, before recording an unreleased album, which was cancelled prior to release in 2010. Some songs from this record were re-recorded for the 2011 Pop Will Eat Itself album New Noise Designed By A Sadist, whilst others remain unreleased to date.

New PWEI: 2011–present
In July 2011, a new line-up was announced, featuring Graham Crabb (as the only original member), fellow vocalist Mary Byker (Gaye Bykers on Acid, Apollo 440, Pigface), guitarist Tim Muddiman (Gary Numan), drummer Jason Bowld (Pitchshifter, Killing Joke) and bassist Davey Bennett (This Burning Age). 
In October that year the album New Noise Designed by a Sadist was released on Cooking Vinyl, produced by Monti & Rob Holliday (Sulpher, The Prodigy) and was followed by a UK tour. The band further toured in March and December 2012. 
The single "Disguise" was featured as Radio 6 Breakfast Show 'Single of the Week' and an instrumental "Back to Business" was used on Top Gear. Crabb & Byker also guested on Soccer AM. The band began working on a remix album to complement New Noise Designed by a Sadist, but this project was discontinued in favour of the Watch the Bitch Blow EP. They toured the UK in December 2013 as one third of a triple bill featuring The Wonder Stuff and Jesus Jones.

The Watch the Bitch Blow EP was released in March, 2014, through PledgeMusic, and the "Reclaim the Game (Funk FIFA)" single featuring Brazilian rapper BNegão (Planet Hemp) followed in June 2014 for the 2014 FIFA World Cup, as a protest song against FIFA. The album Anti-Nasty League was planned for release in September–October, but was delayed to fit in with the band's live schedule in 2015. It was released exclusively and independently through the band's shop: shop.popwilleatitself.net in April 2015. A 9-date UK tour was undertaken in May. In May, the band signed a publishing administration deal with Bucks Music Group for the ANL album only.

On Friday 26 August 2016, PWEI headlined the opening day of Infest, with Fuzz Townshend rejoining on drums. Over the following years, they continued playing occasional concerts in the UK, with line-ups varying between shows to agree with the availability of the band members. In addition to Townshend, former band members Richard March and Adam Mole rejoined the band, resulting in a near original lineup by 2018.

Seven years after its original release, Anti-Nasty League was made available digitally on the band's official store and major music streaming and download services. Two months later, in June 2022, a new single, "The Poppies Strike Back", was released. A second, "Chihuahua", followed in September. It was the first new music to be released by the band since 2015's Anti-Nasty League aside from a 2018 box set compilation which included several unreleased remixes and a rough demo.

Vestan Pance
All PWEI songs were credited to Vestan Pance. It was a pseudonym for the band as a whole. Although the songs were mainly Crabb or Mansell compositions, using a pseudonym was considered more interesting than just "All songs by Pop Will Eat Itself". When Townshend joined the band, an attempt to change the name to 'Vestan Pance and Socks' was denied by RCA.

Members
 Graham Crabb - vocals, drums, keyboards, programming
 Mary Byker - vocals, keyboards, programming
 Davey Bennett - guitars, bass
 Richard March - bass, guitars, keyboards, programming
 Adam Mole - guitars, keyboards, programming
 Fuzz Townshend - drums, keyboards, programming

Former members
 Clint Mansell - vocals, bass, guitars, keyboards, programming, samples, turntables, drums
 Kerry "The Buzzard" Hammond - guitars
 Tim Muddiman - guitars, bass, keyboards
 Jason Bowld - drums, programming

Timeline

Discography

Albums

Live albums
 Weird's Bar and Grill (Live) (1993) UK No. 44
 The Radio 1 Sessions 1986-87 (1997)
 Reformation: Nottingham Rock City 20.01.05 (2005)
 Reformation: Birmingham Carling Academy 22.01.05 (2005)
 Reformation: Birmingham Carling Academy 23.01.05 (2005)
 Reformation: London Shepherds Bush Empire 24.01.05 (2005)
 Reformation: London Shepherds Bush Empire 25.01.05 (2005)
 On Patrol in the UK 2012 (2012)

Compilations
 Now for a Feast! (1988)
 16 Different Flavours of Hell (Best of) (1993) UK No. 73
 Wise Up Suckers (BMG best of) (1996)
 PWEI Product 1986-1994 (Anthology) (2002)
 The Best Of (2008)
 Def Comms 86-18 (2018)

Remix albums
 Two Fingers My Friends! (1995) UK No. 25
 Reclaim the Game (Funk FIFA) (2014)

EPs
 2000 Light Ales from Home (1986) under the name 'Wild and Wandering'
 The Poppies Say GRRrrr! (1986)
 Poppiecock (1986)
 Very Metal Noise Pollution (1989) UK No. 45
 Amalgamation (1994)
 Watch the Bitch Blow (2014)

Singles

Video releases
 Unspoilt by Progress VHS (1991)
 Reformation: Birmingham Carling Academy 23.01.05 DVD (2005)

Music videos
 "Sweet Sweet Pie" (1987)
 "Love Missile F1-11" (1987)
 "Beaver Patrol" (1987)
 "There Is No Love Between Us Anymore" (1988)
 "Def.Con.One" (1989)
 "Can U Dig It?" (1989)
 "Wise Up! Sucker" (1989)
 "Touched by the Hand of Cicciolina" (1990)
 "X Y & Zee" (1990)
 "92°F" (1991)
 "Karmadrome" (1992)
 "Bulletproof!" (1992)
 "Get the Girl! Kill the Baddies!" (1993)
 "R.S.V.P." (1993)
 "Ich Bin Ein Auslander" (1994)
 "Everything's Cool" (1994)
 "Chaos & Mayhem" (2011)
 "Oldskool Cool" (2011)
 "Disguise" (2012)
 "Watch the Bitch Blow" (2014)
 "Babylon RIP" (2014)
 "Reclaim the Game (Funk FIFA)" (2014)
 "Hollow" (2014)
 "21st Century English Civil War" (2015)
 "Angry Man's Deathbed" (2015)

References

External links
 
The Designers Republic

English electronic music groups
English alternative rock groups
British industrial rock musical groups
Musical groups from West Midlands (county)
Interscope Records artists
Nothing Records artists
People from Stourbridge
Infectious Music artists
RCA Records artists